Thomas Highgate (by 1533 – 15 August 1576), of Hayes, Middlesex was an English member of parliament.

Family
His wife's name is unrecorded, and she presumably predeceased him. He left a son named William, and a daughter, Anne, who married the MP, Henry Duport.

Career
He was a Member of the Parliament of England for Devizes in April 1554 and Wilton in 1559, 1563 and 1571.

References

1576 deaths
People from Hayes, Hillingdon
English MPs 1554
English MPs 1559
English MPs 1563–1567
English MPs 1571
Year of birth uncertain